Kadal is a 1968 Indian Malayalam-language film, directed by M. Krishnan Nair and produced by P. Subramaniam. The film stars Madhu, Sharada, Thikkurissy Sukumaran Nair and Shobha. The film had musical score by M. B. Sreenivasan.

Cast
Madhu as Antony
Sharada as Mary
K. P. Ummer as Lazar
Rajasree as Rajeena
S. P. Pillai as Peter
Bahadoor as Paul
K. V. Shanthi as Reetha
Nellikode Bhaskaran as Lopez
 Baby Shobha
 Baby Sree Thikkurissi
 Baby Vijaya

Soundtrack
The music was composed by M. B. Sreenivasan and the lyrics were written by Sreekumaran Thampi.

References

External links
 

1968 films
1960s Malayalam-language films
Films directed by M. Krishnan Nair